Run of River Power or ROR Power is a Canadian based energy company. Its business in the renewable energy sector, creating sustainable energy through its portfolio of run-of-river and biomass projects in British Columbia.

History
In June 2005, Run of River was listed on the TSX Venture Exchange by conducting a private placement of 14.8 million shares at $0.60/share to raise $8.9 million. The funds and a $13 million loan from Industrial Alliance Insurance and Financial Services, were used to purchase a 90% interest in Rockford Energy, which included the Brandywine Creek facility and five other nearby projects from Ledcor Power. The company was acquired by Concord SCCP General Partner (I) Inc. in May 2014 and delisted from the TSX Venture Exchange.

Power Projects

Brandywine Creek (8MW, 34-40GWh/yr)
This project was awarded a 20-year power purchase agreement in BC Hydro's 2001 Call for Green Energy Projects. Construction work was carried out in less than one year by Ledcor Power and the project was commissioned in May 2005. Capital costs were originally estimated at $11 million, but additional fish studies and agreements with local government and First Nations inflated costs to $14 million.

Annual revenues have been estimated at $2.2m for a total of "around $50 million" over 20 years. However, according to a 2008 report, Run of River's Brandywine project is "money-losing".

Development Projects

Skookum Power Project (25MW, 68GWh/yr)
A 40-year PPA was awarded to Run of River Inc. in 2008 Call. Current plans call for construction of the $94 million project to begin in 2012 and commissioning in Jan 2014.

Upper Pitt River (155MW)
This project, proposed by Run of River's subsidiary Northwest Cascade Power Ltd., included seven generation facilities and a 42 km transmission line that would have passed through Pinecone Burke Provincial Park. Capital costs were estimated at $350 million.

The proposal reached the pre-application stage of British Columbia's Environmental Assessment process before being terminated by Environment Minister Barry Penner, who refused to redraw park boundaries in order to accommodate the required transmission line. While Run of River's management and the local First Nation were united in their opposition to this decision, the firm is currently seeking an alternative transmission route.

References

External links
 www.runofriverpower.com

Electric power companies of Canada
Renewable energy companies of Canada
Energy in British Columbia
Companies based in British Columbia
Delta, British Columbia
Canadian companies established in 2005
Energy companies established in 2005
Renewable resource companies established in 2005
2005 establishments in British Columbia
Companies formerly listed on the TSX Venture Exchange